Rudolf Maister (pen name: Vojanov; 29 March 1874 – 26 July 1934) was a Slovene military officer, poet and political activist. The soldiers who fought under Maister's command in northern Slovenia became known as "Maister's fighters". Maister was also an accomplished poet and self-taught painter.

Life

Early career and fight for Styria
Maister was born in the Upper Carniolan commercial town of Kamnik, then part of Austria-Hungary. A career soldier, during World War I, he served in the Austro-Hungarian Army. In 1917, he was sent to Graz promoted to the rank of a major. In 1918, near the end of the war when it was obvious that Austria-Hungary was losing, the city council of Maribor proclaimed the annexation of Maribor to Austria. Maister organized Slovene volunteer forces of 4000 soldiers and 200 officers and in the night of 23 November 1918 seized control of the city of Maribor and the surrounding region of Lower Styria. This date has been recognized as a state holiday in Slovenia since 2005. The Slovene National Council for Lower Styria awarded him the rank of general on November 1. The German-speaking city was thus secured for the newly formed State of Slovenes, Croats and Serbs, which united with the Kingdom of Serbia into the Kingdom of Serbs, Croats and Slovenes on December 1. Maister's rank as a general was confirmed by the National Government of the Slovene part of the Kingdom as a "lieutenant with the title and character of a general" on 11 December 1918, which was later also confirmed by the Belgrade Government.

Marburg's Bloody Sunday
On 27 January 1919, Germans awaiting the American peace delegation at the marketplace in Maribor were fired on by Slovenian troops under the command of Maister. Nine Germans were killed and more than eighteen were seriously wounded. The responsibility for the shooting has not been conclusively established. German sources accused Maister's troops of shooting without cause, while Slovenian witnesses, such as Maks Pohar, testified that the Germans (some still in the uniforms of the German paramilitary organization called the Green Guard) attacked the Slovene soldiers guarding the city hall. The Austrian Germans allegedly attacked the police inspector, Ivan Senekovič, and then pressed towards the Slovenian soldiers in front of the city hall. A Slovenian version of this event involves a German firing a revolver in the direction of the Slovenian soldiers, who responded spontaneously by firing into the civilian crowd. The event became known as Marburg's Bloody Sunday.

Fight for Carinthia

In November 1919, Maister's forces joined the Kingdom of Serbs, Croats and Slovenes Army's offensive in Carinthia. Maister joined them later and took part of the capture of Klagenfurt. After the Carinthian Plebiscite, in which majority of the local Slovenian population decided to remain part of Austria, Maister withdrew to private life. He spent most of his later life in an estate near Planina in Inner Carniola.

Poetry
Maister also wrote poetry, which he published in two collected volumes in 1904 and in 1929. Most of his poetry follows Post-Romantic aesthetics, and it is influenced by the 19th-century Slovene lyrical and patriotic poetry of Simon Jenko, Simon Gregorčič, and Anton Aškerc.

References

Further reading
Bruno Hartman, Rudolf Maister: general in pesnik (Ljubljana: Državna založba Slovenije, 2006)

External links

1874 births
1934 deaths
People from Kamnik
Austro-Hungarian military personnel of World War I
Austro-Hungarian Army officers
Slovenian generals
Slovenian poets
Slovenian male poets
Slovenian soldiers
Recipients of the Order of St. Sava
Austro-Hungarian emigrants to Yugoslavia
Austro-Hungarian poets
Austro-Hungarian painters